Hemin Pratap Desai (born September 10, 1977) is an Indian-born cricketer who played for the Oman national cricket team at the List A level.

His highest score in List A cricket was achieved on November 27, 2007, against Namibia in the 2007 ICC World Cricket League Division Two. Opening the batting, Desai completely dominated his first-wicket partnership with Zeeshan Siddiqui, scoring an extraordinary 82 runs out of 84 before being first out. One run went to his batting partner and one to Extras. Oman won the game by two wickets.

Notes

References
 
 

1977 births
Living people
Omani cricketers
Cricketers from Gujarat
Omani cricket captains
People from Valsad district
Indian emigrants to Oman
Indian expatriates in Oman